The Peppara Wildlife Sanctuary is a wildlife sanctuary in Thiruvananthapuram district of Kerala, India. It consists of the catchment area of the Karamana River, which originates from Chemmunjimottai, the tallest hill within the sanctuary. The sanctuary is named after the Peppara Dam, commissioned in 1983 to augment the drinking water supply to Thiruvananthapuram city and suburban areas. Considering the ecological significance of the area, it was declared a sanctuary in 1983. The terrain is undulating with elevation ranging from 100 m to 1717 m. The area of the sanctuary is 75 km2 with tropical moist evergreen forests and myristica swamps. It is part of the Agasthyamala Biosphere Reserve.

History
The area was formerly a part of the Paruthippally range of the Thiruvananthapuram territorial division. Forests consist of part of the Palode reserve and part of Kottoor reserve.

Geography
The Peppara Wildlife Sanctuary is situated on Thiruvananthapuram-Ponmudi Road, about 50 km northeast of Thiruvananthapuram.

The major peaks in the sanctuary are Chemmunjimottai (1717m), Athirumalai (1594m), Arumukhamkunnu (1457m), Koviltherimalai (1313m) and Nachiyadikunnu (957m). The major rivers are Karamana River and its tributaries.

Biology and ecology
Forest types include West coast tropical evergreen, Southern hilltop tropical evergreen, West coast semi-evergreen, Southern moist mixed deciduous forest, Myristica swamp forest, sub-montane hill valley swamp forest etc.

Trees
Common tree species are Terminalia paniculata, T. bellerica, Pterocarpus marsupium, Palaquium ellipticum, Mesua ferrea, Hopea parviflora, Bombax ceiba, Syzygium cumini, Lagerstroemia microcarpa, Albizia procera, Alstonia scholaris, etc.

Animals
The sanctuary has several mammals, birds, reptiles and amphibians. 43 species of mammals, 233 species of birds, 46 species of reptiles, 13 species of amphibians and 27 species of fishes are reported from the sanctuary. The common mammals found are tiger, leopard, sloth bear, elephant, sambar (deer), bonnet macaque, Nilgiri langur, Nilgiri tahr.

Gallery

See also

 Kolakolli
 Tourism in Thiruvananthapuram

External links

 Kerala tourism official site
 Information about Nedumangad

Notes

Geography of Thiruvananthapuram district
Wildlife sanctuaries in Kerala
Tourist attractions in Thiruvananthapuram district
South Western Ghats moist deciduous forests
Wildlife sanctuaries of the Western Ghats
South Western Ghats montane rain forests
Protected areas of Kerala
1983 establishments in Kerala
Protected areas established in 1983